A nasheed (Arabic: singular  , plural  , meaning: "chants") is a work of vocal music, partially coincident with hymns, that is either sung a cappella or with instruments, according to a particular style or tradition within Islam.

Nasheeds are popular throughout the Islamic world. The material and lyrics of a nasheed usually make reference to Islamic beliefs, history, and religion, as well as current events.

Scholars on instruments 
 
The founders of all four of the major madhabs – Islamic schools of thought – as well as many other prominent scholars, have debated the legitimacy and use of musical instruments. For instance, according to the Hanafi school of thought, associated with the scholar Abu Hanifa, if a person is known to play musical instruments to divert people from God, their testimony is not to be accepted.

According to the widely acknowledged book of authentic hadiths Sahih al-Bukhari of Sunni scholarship, Muhammad taught that musical instruments are sinful:

Abu 'Amir or Abu Malik Al-Ash'ari [a companion of Muhammad] said that he heard Muhammad saying: "From among my followers there will be some people who will consider illegal sexual intercourse, the wearing of silk, the drinking of alcoholic drinks and the use of musical instruments, as lawful. And there will be some people who will stay near the side of a mountain and in the evening their shepherd will come to them with their sheep and ask them for something, but they will say to him, 'Return to us tomorrow.' Allah will destroy them during the night and will let the mountain fall on them, and He will transform the rest of them into monkeys and pigs and they will remain so till the Day of Resurrection."

There is also evidence for music being permitted in the same book. Aisha said: 
Abu Bakr came to my house while two small Ansari girls were singing beside me the stories of the Ansar concerning the Day of Buath. And they were not singers. Abu Bakr said protestingly, "Musical instruments of Satan in the house of Allah's Messenger!" It happened on the `Id day and Allah's Messenger said, "O Abu Bakr! There is an `Id for every nation and this is our `Id."

A few historical Islamic scholars such as Imam Al-Ghazali have also said that musical instruments may be used as long as the songs are not promoting that which is Haraam.

Modern interpretations 

A new generation of nasheed artists use a wide variety of musical instruments in their art.
Many new nasheed artists are non-Arabs and sing in different languages. Some nasheed bands are Native Deen, Outlandish, and Raihan.  Other well-known artists are Ahmed Bukhatir, Yusuf Islam (formerly known as Cat Stevens), Sami Yusuf, Junaid Jamshed, Maher Zain, Harris J, Siedd, Sulthan Ahmed, Humood AlKhudher, Hamza Namira, Atif Aslam, Raef, Mesut Kurtis, S'nada, Dawud Wharnsby, Zain Bhikha, Muhammad Al-Muqit and Mishary Rashid Al-Afasy, Maher Zain.

In the Indian subcontinent, qawwali is famous for the Islamic relationship with spirituality in Urdu. It is said that many spiritual men like Bhullay Shah, Kabir Singh, Baba Fareed and others spread the message of Islam in Punjabi, Saraiki, and Urdu.

The Grand Masters of qawwali are said to be Ustad (a form of respectfully addressing a teacher or master) Nusrat Fateh Ali Khan and Rahat Fateh Ali Khan.

Nasheed artists appeal to a worldwide Muslim audience and may perform at Islamic oriented festivals (such as Mawlid), conferences, concerts and shows, including ISNA. Other artists and organisations such as Nasheed Bay promote an instrument-free stance, differing from the current trends of the increasing usage of instruments in nasheed.

The Islamic State (ISIS) is known for the use of nasheeds in their videos and propaganda, notable examples being the chant Dawlat al-Islam Qamat ("The Islamic State Has Been Established"), which came to be viewed as an unofficial anthem of ISIL, and Salil al-sawarim ("Clashing of Swords"). ISIS has also produced nasheeds in French. The 2016 nasheed  ("My revenge") contains praise of the January 2015 Paris attacks, the November 2015 Paris attacks, and the 2016 Brussels bombings. The 2016 chant  ("For Love") glorifies martyrdom.

See also

References

Further reading 
 Thibon, Jean-Jacques, Inshad, in Muhammad in History, Thought, and Culture: An Encyclopedia of the Prophet of God (2 vols.), Edited by C. Fitzpatrick and A. Walker, Santa Barbara, ABC-CLIO, 2014, Vol. I, pp. 294–298. 

Nasheeds